Stevensburg is an unincorporated community located  in Preston County, West Virginia, United States.

References 

Unincorporated communities in West Virginia
Unincorporated communities in Preston County, West Virginia